The General Lutheran Church, Inc. (GLC) is a small Lutheran denomination<ref>ELCA Yearbook Committee, Evangelical Lutheran Church in America 2018, Augsburg Fortress Publishers, Minneapolis, November 2017.</ref> organized on March 9, 2014, and incorporated in the state of Indiana on October 26, 2017. The address of incorporation passed to Puerto Rico when the church changed leadership. It was founded when ministers of several Lutheran church bodies (Namely: Association of Independent Evangelical Lutheran Churches, Fellowship of Evangelical Lutheran Churches, Independent Lutheran Diocese, Lutheran Evangelical Ministries, Lutheran Evangelical Protestant Churches, Lutheran Orthodox Church, and Missionary Lutheran Church) who objected to various positions held in their respective churches, specifically regarding atonement, women's ordination, worship styles, and the Lutheran Confessions, met to discuss these and other issues of concern. This meeting led to the establishment of the General Lutheran Church and to its endorsement of universal salvation, women's ordination, and flexibility with regards to liturgical matters. The church claims to be a successor to the former Evangelical Lutheran General Synod of the United States of America.

 Theological statement 
The General Lutheran Church values the Lutheran Confessions as expressed in the Book of Concord, other works by Martin Luther, and the writings of Samuel Simon Schmucker as theological guides, and allows its ministers and congregations the liberty of conscience to interpret and apply the teachings of the Confessions. According to the Confessions, Lutherans believe, teach and confess that the Bible is the Word of God and that it is the "sole rule and norm of all doctrine." General Lutherans are free to view the of Book of Concord from either the quia or the quatenus perspective. Those who hold to the quia perspective believe the Book of Concord is a faithful exposition of Scripture. Those who hold to the quatenus perspective subscribe to the Book of Concord insofar as it is faithful to the Scriptures. In the case of ordained ministers and churches in GLC, the quatenus perspective holds only to the position on universal redemption. The rest of the Confessions are accepted as they stand. The denomination expect congregations and ministers to abide by the following set of beliefs:

 Belief in the Father, Son, and Holy Spirit. -- John 1:18
 Belief that Jesus Christ is the Lord and Savior of all. -- First Corinthians 15:22
 Belief that the Bible is the Verbally, Inspired and Inerrant Word of God, and sufficient guide for faith and practice. -- Matthew 4:4; 2 Timothy 3:16
 Belief in two sacraments: Holy Baptism and Holy Communion. -- Luke 22:14-20
 Belief in the just retribution for sin. -- Colossians 3:25
 Belief that there is a wideness in God's mercy. -- Ephesians 2:4-7

The denomination states that it is not an “Evangelical Catholic” community in the sense of having the desire to unite, either ecclesiastically or theologically, with the Roman Catholic church, or any of its positions stated in the Council of Trent and later councils. Rather the GLC professes to be a community that adheres to the generally accepted principles, dogmas, and doctrines of the Protestant faith within Christianity as stated in the Lutheran Confessions. 

The denomination bases its belief on universal salvation from Martin Luther's statement, "God forbid that I should limit the time of acquiring faith to the present life. In the depth of the Divine mercy, there may be an opportunity to win it in the future," and from the New Testament: "And when I am lifted up from the earth, I will draw everyone to myself" (John 12:32), "Everyone will see the salvation of God" (Luke 3:6), "Our hope is set on the living God, who is the savior of all people, especially those who believe" (1 Timothy 4:10), and "in Adam all die and in Christ all live" (Romans 5; 1 Corinthians 15).

Polity
The General Lutheran Church is a semi-congregationalist denomination headed by the general leadership, which consists of the dean, the deputy dean, and the provost of the Institute of Pastoral Ministry. The dean is the presiding officer, executive administrator, and spiritual leader of the denomination. The dean is invested with the responsibility of ensuring the purpose and mission of the General Lutheran Church are carried out and that the statement of faith and the general principles of the Christian faith are adhered to. Responsibilities include overseeing and regulating issues related to the administrative, legislative, ministerial, evangelistic, educational, missionary, benevolent, and other interests of the denomination. The deputy dean is appointed by the dean and serves to assist, advise, and counsel the dean. The deputy dean has no decision-making powers. All final decisions regarding polity and procedure belong exclusively to the dean. The national leadership exercises no control or authority over individual congregations or pastors and serves only in an advisory capacity. It assists pastors in crisis situations or by request.

Pastoral training
Martin Luther Institute of Pastoral Ministry offers free certificate courses in systematic theology, Lutheran history, pastoral counseling, biblical languages, pastoral theology, and the Lutheran confessions to meet the academic requirements for ordination as a General Lutheran minister. The courses are taught by qualified faculty who all hold degrees from institutions accredited by agencies recognized by the United States Department of Education or hold accredited status in their respective countries. The institute is a member of the Concordia Academic Theology Consortium, Intl., which is a partnership and collaboration effort among the following independent not for profit international institutions that deal in sharing credit-bearing theological courses and programs. 

 International Faith Theological Seminary and University College (Kenya)  
 Facultade Teologica Missao Macedonia (Brazil)  
 Mosupatsela Lutheran Theological College (South Africa)  
 Martin Luther Institute of Pastoral Ministry, Bible & Theology (Puerto Rico)
 Social statement 
The General Lutheran Church is opposed to same-sex marriage, the ordination of practicing gays and lesbians, and abortions not medically necessary. However, engaging in abusive or malicious behaviors towards the gay and lesbian community, all immigrants, and those who have made the difficult decision to have an abortion are prohibited. The denomination condemns racism, homophobia, xenophobia, sexism, and all other types of hate and discrimination at all levels.

References

Further reading
 Luther's Large Catechism  Luther's Small Catechism  Online Books by S. S. Schmucker  The Book of Concord ''

External links 
General Lutheran Church
The Lutheran Observer

Christian denominations
Christian denominations established in the 21st century
Lutheranism in the United States
Lutheran denominations
Lutheran denominations in North America